Little Fugitive is a 2006 remake of the 1953 film of the same name.  It was directed by Joanna Lipper and produced by Nicholas Paleologos. The film is set in present day Brooklyn and tells the story of 11-year-old Lenny (Nicolas Martí Salgado) who must take care of his 7-year-old brother, Joey (David Castro), while their father (Peter Dinklage) is in jail and their mother works long hours a nursing home.  When Lenny plays a practical joke on Joey that goes too far, Joey soon runs away to Coney Island.

Cast

Release

Critical response

The film was well received by critics.  The Economist has described it as “an assured mixture of charm and depth”, L Magazine found it “a lovely ode to childhood and to Brooklyn”.

References

Sources

External links

2006 drama films
2006 films
American drama films
Remakes of American films
Films set in Coney Island
2000s English-language films
2000s American films